Tuhuti may be:
an alternative spelling of the name of the Egyptian god Thoth
genitive of Tuhutum, a Magyar commander serving king Árpád mentioned in the Gesta Hungarorum
an alias used by black supremacist leader Dwight York